Archibald Holly Patterson (May 31, 1898, in Uniondale, New York, United States – September 20, 1980)  was the Republican county executive of Nassau County, New York, from 1953 to 1962. He had previously served as presiding supervisor of the town of Hempstead.

A nursing home in Uniondale is named for Patterson as well as the school library at Nassau Community College.

1898 births
1980 deaths
Town supervisors in New York (state)
Nassau County Executives
New York (state) Republicans
20th-century American politicians